Robert Daniel King (born 10 July 1978) is an English cricketer.  King was a right-handed batsman who bowled right-arm off break.  He was born in Stoke-on-Trent, Staffordshire.

King made his debut for Staffordshire in the 2003 Minor Counties Championship against Buckinghamshire.  King played Minor counties cricket for Staffordshire from 2003 to 2007, which included 22 Minor Counties Championship matches and 11 MCCA Knockout Trophy matches.  In 2004, he made his only List A appearance against Lancashire in the Cheltenham & Gloucester Trophy.  In this match, he scored 6 runs opening the batting, before being dismissed by Dominic Cork.

References

External links
Robert King at ESPNcricinfo
Robert King at CricketArchive

1978 births
Living people
Cricketers from Stoke-on-Trent
English cricketers
Staffordshire cricketers